Vasco Rafael Fortes Lopes (born 2 September 1999) is a professional footballer who plays for Akritas Chlorakas. Born in Portugal, he represents Cape Verde national team internationally.

International career
Lopes made his debut for Cape Verde national team on 26 March 2021 in an AFCON 2021 qualifier against Cameroon.

References

External links
 
 
 

1999 births
Living people
People from Portalegre, Portugal
Portuguese people of Cape Verdean descent
Sportspeople from Portalegre District
Cape Verdean footballers
Portuguese footballers
Association football forwards
Campeonato de Portugal (league) players
Liga Portugal 2 players
Cape Verde international footballers
G.D. Gafanha players
F.C. Vizela players
SC Mirandela players
S.C. Farense players
Cape Verdean expatriate footballers
Cape Verdean expatriate sportspeople in France
Expatriate footballers in France